Isle of the Dead is the best-known painting of Swiss Symbolist artist Arnold Böcklin (1827–1901). Prints were very popular in central Europe in the early 20th century—Vladimir Nabokov observed in his 1936 novel Despair that they could be "found in every Berlin home".

Böcklin produced several different versions of the painting between 1880 and 1901, which today are exhibited in Basel, New York City, Berlin and Leipzig.

Description and meaning 
All versions of Isle of the Dead depict a desolate and rocky islet seen across an expanse of dark water. A small rowing boat is just arriving at a water gate and seawall on shore. An oarsman maneuvers the boat from the stern. In the bow, facing the gate, is a standing figure clad entirely in white. Just ahead of the figure is a white, festooned object commonly interpreted as a coffin. The tiny islet is dominated by a dense grove of tall, dark cypress trees—associated by long-standing tradition with cemeteries and mourning—which is closely hemmed in by precipitous cliffs. Furthering the funerary theme are what appear to be sepulchral portals and windows on the rock faces.

Böcklin himself provided no public explanation as to the meaning of the painting, though he did describe it as "a dream picture: it must produce such a stillness that one would be awed by a knock on the door". The title, which was conferred upon it by the art dealer Fritz Gurlitt in 1883, was not specified by Böcklin, though it does derive from a phrase in an 1880 letter he sent to the painting's original commissioner. Not knowing the history of the early versions of the painting (see below), many observers have interpreted the oarsman as representing the boatman Charon, who ferried souls to the underworld in Greek mythology. The water would then be either the River Styx or the River Acheron, and his white-clad passenger a recently deceased soul transiting to the afterlife.

Origins and inspiration 

Isle of the Dead evokes, in part, the English Cemetery in Florence, Italy, where the first three versions were painted. The cemetery was close to Böcklin's studio and was also where his infant daughter Maria was buried. (In all, Böcklin lost 8 of his 14 children.)

The model for the rocky islet was perhaps Pontikonisi, a small, lush island near Corfu, which is adorned with a small chapel amid a cypress grove, perhaps in combination with the mysterious rocky island of Strombolicchio near the famous volcano Stromboli, Sicily. (Another less likely candidate is the island of Ponza in the Tyrrhenian Sea.)

Versions 
Böcklin completed the first version of the painting in May 1880 for his patron Alexander Günther, but kept it himself. In April 1880, while the painting was in progress, Böcklin's Florence studio had been visited by Marie Berna, née Christ (widow of financier Dr. Georg von Berna (1836–1865) and soon-to-be wife of the German politician Waldemar, Count of Oriola (1854–1910)). She was struck by the first version of this "dream image" (now in the Kunstmuseum Basel), which sat half completed on the easel, so Böcklin painted a smaller version on wood for her (now in the Metropolitan Museum in New York City). At Berna's request, he added the coffin and female figure, in allusion to her husband's death from diphtheria years earlier. Subsequently, he added these elements to the earlier painting. He called these works  ("Tomb Island"). (Sometimes the "Basel" version is credited as the first one, sometimes the "New York".) It was acquired by the Gottfried Keller-Stiftung in 1920.

The third version was painted in 1883 for Böcklin's dealer Fritz Gurlitt. Beginning with this version, one of the burial chambers in the rocks on the right bears Böcklin's own initials: "A.B." (In 1933, this version was put up for sale, and a noted Böcklin admirer Adolf Hitler acquired it. He hung it first at the Berghof in Obersalzberg and then, after 1940, in the New Reich Chancellery in Berlin. It is now at the Alte Nationalgalerie, Berlin.)

Financial imperatives resulted in a fourth version in 1884, which was ultimately acquired by the entrepreneur and art collector Baron Heinrich Thyssen and hung at his Berliner Bank subsidiary. It was burned after a bomb attack during World War II and survives only as a black-and-white photograph.

A fifth version was commissioned in 1886 by the Museum of Fine Arts, Leipzig, where it still hangs.

In the last year of his life Böcklin painted a sixth version with his son Carlo. It hangs in the Hermitage Museum, Saint-Petersburg.

In 1888, Böcklin created a painting called  ("Isle of Life"). Probably intended as an antipole to the Isle of the Dead, it also shows a small island, but with all signs of joy and life. Together with the first version of the Isle of the Dead, this painting is part of the collection of the Kunstmuseum Basel.

Versions 
 May 1880—Oil on canvas; 111 × 155 cm; Öffentliche Kunstsammlung, Kunstmuseum, Basel.
 June 1880—Oil on board; 74 × 122 cm; The Metropolitan Museum of Art, Reisinger Fund, New York.
 1883—Oil on board; 80 × 150 cm; Alte Nationalgalerie, Staatliche Museen zu Berlin.
 1884—Oil on copper; 81 × 151 cm; destroyed in Berlin during World War II.
 1886—Oil on board; 80 × 150 cm; Museum der bildenden Künste, Leipzig.

Admirers 
The painting has attracted a wide variety of admirers. Freud kept a reproduction in his office; Lenin had one above his bed; Hitler bought one of the originals. Vladimir Nabokov wrote that reproductions of the painting could be “found in every Berlin home”.

Works inspired by Isle of the Dead

Paintings 
 Salvador Dalí's 1932 painting The True Painting of "The Isle of the Dead" by Arnold Bocklin at the Hour of the Angelus is inspired by Böcklin's work.
 The Swiss artist H. R. Giger created a version of the picture, Hommage à Böcklin (1977), in his typical biomechanical style.
 Fabrizio Clerici, the noted Italian Surrealist painter, paraphrased Böcklin's seminal painting in two of his works: Le Presenze, dating from 1974, and Latitudine Böcklin, completed in 1979.
 Australian Surrealist painter James Gleeson drew a parallel with the painting and the entrance to the underworld in the Aeneid in his 1989 work Avernus Transvisioned as Böcklin's Isle.
 German artist Michael Sowa has painted Böcklin 6th version, a parody of the painting in  1992.

Art 
 At the OpenArt 2022 exhibit in Örebro, Sweden, a fifteen metre long and seven metre high mixed-media sculpture by artist Henrik Jonsson was exhibited. The sculpture is based upon Böcklin's paintings.

Drama
Theatre
 August Strindberg's play The Ghost Sonata (1907) ends with the image of Isle of the Dead accompanied by melancholy music. It was one of Strindberg's favourite pictures.

Ballet
 Liam Scarlett’s final work for San Francisco Ballet was Die Toteninsel (2019), inspired by the symphonic poem of Rachmaninov as well as the painting. 

Film
 Val Lewton used the painting in scene backgrounds for his 1943 film I Walked with a Zombie, a story about an island of the dead.
 Val Lewton's later 1945 horror film Isle of the Dead was also inspired by the painting, which serves as a backdrop to the picture's title sequence.
 The painting has inspired two National Film Board of Canada animated shorts.
 It is the explicit backdrop for Norman McLaren's short animated film A Little Phantasy on a 19th-century Painting (1946).
 Animator Craig Welch has stated that both the painting and McLaren's film were inspirations for his 1996 short How Wings Are Attached to the Backs of Angels.
 Design elements from the painting appear in mattes and sets in the 1951 film The Tales of Hoffmann.
 A large copy of the painting appears on a wall midway through Terry Gilliam's 1995 science fiction movie 12 Monkeys.
 The 2012 American computer-animated horror-comedy film "Hotel Transylvania" features several copies of the painting (possibly, the third version) on walls around Dracula's castle, including just inside the door of Mavis' bedroom.
 Alien: Covenant (2017) references the painting during a scene set in the garden

Television
 Böcklin's painting was used in season 5 episode 3 of Pretty Little Liars ("Surfing the Aftershocks"), mysteriously affecting one of the main characters.
 In the manga and anime series Kuroshitsuji, is shown a place called "Island of Death", described as a sanctuary for demons. It is also the designated area to commence a formal duel between individuals of the said race.
 The painting is featured in the Netflix comedy anime series Neo Yokio, in which the characters briefly magically enter the painting itself.

Literature 
 In J. G. Ballard's 1966 novel The Crystal World, Böcklin's second version of the painting is invoked to describe the gloom of the opening scene at Port Matarre.
 Roger Zelazny used the picture as an inspiration for the meeting place of two mythological beings (one of them the alter-ego of the protagonist, Francis Sandow) in his novel Isle of the Dead (1969). In-universe, Sandow references the painting as he recollects having created the world where it lies.
 Bernard Cornwell's The Warlord Chronicles (1995–1997) associates Dorset's Isle of Portland with the painting's isle. It is described as a place of internal exile and damnation. The causeway that almost links the real-life island to the mainland was supposed to be guarded to keep the dead (including the criminally insane) from crossing the Fleet and escaping back into Britain.
 Graphic novel Ile des morts (text: Thomas Mosdi, drawings: Guillaume Sorel) has the pictures playing a key role in its gothic, Lovecraftian story.
 Gerhard Meier's 1979 novel Isle of the Dead (Toteninsel) references Böcklin's painting.

Music

Classical composers
 The Island of the Dead (1890) is a symphonic poem by Romantic composer Heinrich Schülz-Beuthen evoking the painting.
 Andreas Hallén, a Swedish Romantic composer, wrote a symphonic poem "Die Toteninsel" in 1898.
 Dezso d'Antalffy, a Hungarian Romantic composer, wrote a symphonic poem "Die Toteninsel" in 1907.
 Sergei Rachmaninoff also composed a symphonic poem Isle of the Dead, Op. 29 (1909), inspired by a black-and-white print of the painting. He said that had he seen the colour original, he probably would not have written the music.
 Felix Woyrsch composed 3 Böcklin Phantasies (Die Toteninsel, Der Eremit, Im Spiel der Wellen), Op. 53 (1910).
 One of the four tone poems of German composer Max Reger's Vier Tondichtungen nach A. Böcklin (Op. 128, 1913) is "Die Toteninsel" (No. 3), based on the painting.
 In the same year, Reger's disciple Fritz Lubrich, Junior [1888–1971] composed  (Three Romantic Tonstücke after Böcklin's Pictures; Op. 37), an organ work of which No. 3 is also The Dead Island.
 Visit on the Island of the Dead (2009–2010) is a symphonic poem for orchestra, composed by the Norwegian composer Kristian Oma Rønnes.

Pop music
 The Swedish neoclassical band Arcana used an image of Isle of the Dead on the cover of their debut album Dark Age of Reason (1996).
 An album by Harald Blüchel was named after the painting Die Toteninsel (Zauberberg-Trilogie Teil 1) (2006). The third version of the painting is shown on the cover of this album.
 The heavy metal band Atlantean Kodex used Die Toteninsel (Version III) as a cover for their first full-length album, The Golden Bough (October 2010).
 American songwriter and singer Rykarda Parasol wrote her song "Island of the Dead (Oh Mi, Oh My)" for the Amsterdam Van Gogh Museum's exhibition Dreams of nature (2012), where the fifth version of the painting was on show. The song, together with Rachmaninoff's piece, was possible to listen to while watching the painting. The song is on Parasol's 2013 album Against the Sun.
 French blackgaze band Alcest recorded a song, "L'Île Des Morts," inspired by the paintings, for their album Spiritual Instinct, released October 25, 2019.
 The Spanish/American rock band Alfonso Cronopio Trio (also known as A.C.T.) led by Alfonso Cronopio (founder of the Spanish 80s hardcore band TDeK) released the song "Pagando al barquero" in 2015. The song itself as well as the music video, are inspired in the Die Toteninsel painting.

Video Games 
A German video game "SIGNALIS" by rose-engine studio references the painting several times, as it plays a crucial role in understanding the relationship between the main character and her lover.

References 

 Eva Perón en la isla de los muertos
 Morris, Gary (2009). Action!: Interviews with Directors from Classical Hollywood to Contemporary Iran (en inglés). Anthem Press. p. 216.

External links 
 The version of the painting at the Metropolitan Museum of Art in New York City
 The version of the painting at the Kunstmuseum Basel
 The version of the painting at the Old National Gallery in Berlin
 Island of the Dead and Florence's Swiss-owned 'English' Cemetery, where Maria Anna Boecklin is buried
 The website toteninsel.net is an encyclopedia created by the French painter Pascal Lecocq to list the references and pastiches of the painting in all arts.

Symbolist paintings
1880 paintings
Paintings about death
Paintings in the collection of the Metropolitan Museum of Art
Paintings in the collection of the Alte Nationalgalerie
Paintings by Arnold Böcklin
Ships in art